Ifloga is a genus of flowering plants in the family Asteraceae.

 Species
Species accepted by the Plants of the World Online as of December 2022:

References

Gnaphalieae
Asteraceae genera